Zsolt Szilágyi (born July 29, 1968 in Oradea, Bihor County, Romania) is a Romanian politician, member of the Hungarian People's Party of Transylvania (PPMT).

He was a Democratic Alliance of Hungarians in Romania (UDMR/RMDSZ) deputy for Bihor County in the 1990–2004 period. At the 2009 European Parliament election he occupied the fourth position on the UDMR/RMDSZ list.

He is the former vice-president of Hungarian People's Party of Transylvania (PPMT) and was the party's candidate for the 2014 Romanian presidential election. He occupied the tenth position on the ballot. 

In the first round of the election, Szilágyi received 0.56% of popular vote, subsequently both him and party president Tibor Toró T. submitted their resignation from their respective positions.

Electoral history

Presidential elections

References 

1968 births
Living people
People from Oradea
Democratic Union of Hungarians in Romania politicians
Hungarian People's Party of Transylvania politicians
Members of the Chamber of Deputies (Romania)
Candidates for President of Romania